Mabilleodes is a genus of moths of the family Crambidae.

Species
Mabilleodes alacralis Hayden, 2011
Mabilleodes anabalis Viette, 1989
Mabilleodes catalalis (Viette, 1953)
Mabilleodes lithosialis (Hampson, 1899)

References

Natural History Museum Lepidoptera genus database

Odontiinae
Crambidae genera
Taxa named by Pierre Viette